Mädler is a lunar impact crater located on the mare that joins Sinus Asperitatis in the north to Mare Nectaris to the southeast. To the west is the prominent crater Theophilus, and Mädler lies amidst the outer rampart.

The rim of Mädler is irregular and somewhat oblong in shape. There is a low central peak that joins a ridge crossing the floor. To the east of the crater are ray markings that include a ring-shape to the northeast.

Satellite craters
By convention these features are identified on lunar maps by placing the letter on the side of the crater midpoint that is closest to Mädler.

References

 
 
 
 
 
 
 
 
 
 
 
 

Impact craters on the Moon